Thiyagadurgam is a selection grade panchayat town in Kallakurichi district in the Indian state of Tamil Nadu.

Demographics
Thiyagadurgam Town Panchayat was a build in Panchayat in 1953, then in 1954 it was a 1st Grade Town Panchayat and then in 1982 it was a Selection Grade Town Panchayat. This town includes 15 wards and 113 streets. Total area is 11.69 km2. The population as of the 2011 census was 18,764. Thiyagadurgam, a Selection Grade Town Panchayat in Kallakurichi district is located northeast of Kallakurichi and 12 km west of Kallakurichi. Villupuram, Cuddalore, and Pondicherry on the east and Thirukovilur, Thiruvannamalai on the north and Kallakurichi, Athur, and Salem on the west are the major urban centers, well connected with this town through districts roads and national Highways (NH 65, NH45) line.

Thiyagadurgam is geographically located at 120 13’ north latitude and at 730 37’ east longitudes. It is 6.24 meters above the sea level. The town is bounded by Udhayamampattu on the north, Gandhi Nagar and Periyamampattu on the west, Pukkulam on the south.
Population 2011

Thiyagadurgam has a population of 18,764 as per 2011 census, consisting 9,467 males and 9,297 females. The town spreads over an extent of 11.65 Kilometers, including 15 wards and 113 streets.

History
There is a small mount in the middle of the town, and there is a fort on the mount. It was under the control of Hyder Ali that 1770 AD was taken over by the British ruler next year, before British ruler take over the fort Tipu Sultan ruled by so many years he was fought for it against for British. The fort was later served as a base for British rule. Now under the control of the Archeological Department of the Government of India.

Travel
The town is well connected by road. National Highway 79 (4 laned) connecting Ulundurpet with Salem abuts the town. TNSTC Buses plying from Chennai to Salem and Kallakurichi pass through this town at regular frequencies. The nearest railway station is at Ulundurpet (26 km).

References

External links
Official website

Cities and towns in Kallakurichi district